The Tekamah Carnegie Library is a historic building in Tekamah, Nebraska. It was built as a Carnegie library by L.G. Wood in 1916, and designed in Prairie School style by architect R.W. Grant. It was dedicated on October 25, 1916. It has been listed on the National Register of Historic Places since March 15, 2005.

References

Carnegie libraries in Nebraska
Libraries on the National Register of Historic Places in Nebraska
Library buildings completed in 1916
National Register of Historic Places in Burt County, Nebraska
Prairie School architecture in Nebraska
1916 establishments in Nebraska